Spiritual wifery is a term first used in America by the Immortalists in and near the Blackstone Valley of Rhode Island and Massachusetts in the 1740s.  The term describes the idea that certain people are divinely destined to meet and share their love (at differing points along the carnal-spiritual spectrum, depending on the particular religious movement involved) after receiving a spiritual confirmation, and regardless of previous civil marital bonds.  Its history in Europe among various Christian primitivistic movements has been well documented.  The followers of Jacob Cochran as early as 1818 used "spiritual wifery" to describe their religious doctrine of free love. Often confused with polygamy, spiritual wifery among the Cochranites was the practice in which communal mates were temporarily assigned and reassigned, either by personal preference or religious authority.

The term was later introduced to the Latter Day Saint movement by John C. Bennett, who openly applied it to the doctrine of plural marriage. According to Helen Mar Whitney, "At the time [in Nauvoo] spiritual wife was the title by which every woman who entered into this order was called, for it was taught and practiced as a spiritual order."   Bennett was soon excommunicated for such offenses.

William Smith, youngest brother of Joseph Smith and an Apostle of and briefly Patriarch to the Church of Jesus Christ of Latter Day Saints, wrote a little-known pamphlet in late 1844, called The Elders' Pocket Companion, explaining his own views on the differences between "the Spiritual Wife System" and "plurality of wives". Smith explained that spiritual wifery was the practice of: (1) a Latter Day Saint woman standing as living proxy for her husband's previous civil wife (or wives) to be "sealed" to him for all eternity by the power of Latter Day Saint priesthood, and (2) unmarried Latter Day Saint  women being sealed plurally to Latter Day Saint men during the "Millennium" (the post-apocalyptic thousand-year reign of Jesus on the earth).  The "plurality of wives doctrine" however, Smith wrote, was simply biblical polygamy as practiced by the "ancient Prophets and Patriarchs".  Citing the Book of Mormon, Smith ended his pamphlet emphasizing that the Book of Mormon, while generally proscribing biblical-type polygamy, does include the caveat, "For if I will, saith the Lord of Hosts, raise up a seed unto me, I WILL COMMAND MY PEOPLE" (emphasis is Smith's). Smith's theories however belied his actions, for he not only had some five civil wives (two of whom he was sealed to by the priesthood) but he was also sealed to some 17 other women, whom he generally referred to as "spiritual wives".

The term complex marriage was later used by the Oneida Community in the 1840s to describe a free marriage practice similar to spiritual wifery.

See also

 Complex marriage
 Spiritual marriage

References

Marriage and religion
Mormonism and polygamy